State Highway 137 (SH 137) is a state highway in west Texas. It runs  from SH 163 near Ozona to U.S. Highway 385 (US 385) near Brownfield. SH 137 was originally established in 1928, and it has been realigned several times since then.

History
 SH 137 was designated on November 19, 1928 from Odessa to the Andrews/Gaines County Line. On June 25, 1929, it extended to McCamey. On March 19, 1930, a portion from Lubbock to Brownfield, which was designated as part of SH 53, was renumbered as a separate section of SH 137, creating a gap. On May 5, 1931, the southern section extended north to the Gaines/Terry County Line, partially closing the gap. The sections were connected on May 28, 1932, closing the gap. On July 16, 1934, the route south of Meadow had become SH 51. On January 25, 1938, it extended south to Brownfield as SH 51 was under construction on a road to the west the bypassed Meadow. On February 11, 1938, SH 137 was extended south to Lamesa, but this was to be cancelled when ROW was acquired. On May 24, 1938, the section south of the Terry county line was to be cancelled when surveys were complete. On September 20, 1938, the section from Brownfield to 2.5 miles north of Lamesa was restored. On October 25, 1938, the section from 2.5 miles north of Lamesa to Lamesa was restored, and SH 137 was extended further south from Lamesa to Rankin. On September 26, 1939, the section from Brownfield to Lubbock been reassigned to U.S. Highway 62. SH 137 had extended south to west of Sheffield, replacing SH 271. On August 20, 1940, the section of SH 137 from Midland to the Midland/Upton County Line was cancelled, creating a gap. On October 22, 1940, the sections of SH 137 from Lamesa to Midland and from the Midland/Upton County Line to Rankin were also cancelled, expanding the gap. On December 3, 1940, the section of SH 137 from Lamesa to Rankin was restored, closing the gap. On March 26, 1942, the section from Lamesa to Rankin was cancelled, with the section from Midland south 12 miles being transferred to FM 9, creating a gap. On April 29, 1942, the sotuhern section of SH 137 from Rankin to Sheffield was transferred to SH 51, eliminating the gap. SH 137 was extended south to Stanton on August 23, 1943, replacing SH 303. On October 26, 1949, SH 137 was extended north from US 62 to SH 51. On December 1, 1953, SH 137 was signed, but not designated, along RM 1800 to SH 158. By 1969, SH 137 was signed along the rest of RM 1800, part of RM 33, and all of RM 865. On May 16, 1984, the route was officially designated along the signed  extension, replacing all of RM 1800, part of RM 33, and all of RM 865.

Junction list

References

137
Transportation in Crockett County, Texas
Transportation in Reagan County, Texas
Transportation in Glasscock County, Texas
Transportation in Midland County, Texas
Transportation in Dawson County, Texas
Transportation in Terry County, Texas
Transportation in Martin County, Texas